The 2008 Wyoming Democratic presidential caucuses were a series of events designed to determine the delegates that the Wyoming Democratic Party sent to the 2008 Democratic National Convention. The party was allocated seven pledged delegates to presidential candidates on March 8 during the Wyoming Democratic County Caucuses. The remaining five pledged delegates were allocated on May 24 during the Wyoming Democratic State Convention. There were six Wyoming superdelegates, so the whole delegation was composed of 18 delegates.

Process

The Wyoming caucus were open to all eligible voters who were registered as Democrats by February 22, 2008. A 15 percent threshold was required in order to receive delegates at any caucus site. Rather than the traditional caucus format, most sites used secret ballots which were then counted and delegates apportioned, without re-caucusing of nonviable groups.

Results

County caucuses

Caucus date: March 8, 2008

National pledged delegates determined: 12

State Convention

Convention date: May 24, 2008

National pledged delegates determined: 5

See also
 2008 Democratic Party presidential primaries
 2008 Wyoming Republican presidential caucuses

References

Wyoming
2008 Wyoming elections
2008